{{DISPLAYTITLE:C24H31NO3}}
The molecular formula C24H31NO3 (molar mass: 381.51 g/mol, exact mass: 381.2304 u) may refer to:

 Ansofaxine, or 4-methylbenzoate desvenlafaxine
 Pipoxizine